Somei may refer to:

 Somei Satoh (born 1947), Japanese classical composer
 Somei..., 2009 album by Merzbow
 Somei village, part of Toshima, Japan

See also
 Somei Yoshino, a hybrid Japanese cherry blossom tree